The 2006 Victorian Football League (VFL) is a semi-professional Australian Rules Football competition featuring 12 teams from Victoria and one team from Tasmania.

It was the 125th season of the Australian rules football competition.

League affiliations
Prior to the 2006 season, the VFL-AFL reserves affiliation which had existed for the previous three seasons between North Melbourne and Port Melbourne was terminated. In its place, North Melbourne arranged to be affiliated with both North Ballarat and Tasmania, with half of its reserves players allocated to each team. Port Melbourne continued as a stand-alone senior team in the competition.

As a result, the competition stayed constant at thirteen teams: ten VFL-AFL affiliations, one AFL reserves team and two stand-alone VFL teams (Port Melbourne and Frankston).

Prior to the season, Springvale came to an arrangement with the City of Casey to relocate to the new Casey Fields multi-sports complex in Cranbourne East. The club changed its name to the Casey Scorpions.

Ladder

Finals Series

Grand Final

Season Awards

Awards
The Jim 'Frosty' Miller Medal was won by Aaron Edwards (Frankston), who kicked 88 goals. 
The J. J. Liston Trophy was also won by Aaron Edwards (Frankston), who polled 18 votes. Edwards finished ahead of Brett Johnson (Williamstown), who was second with 17 votes, and Daniel Harford (Northern Bullants), who was third with 14 votes.
The Fothergill-Round Medal was won by Jason Davenport (Geelong reserves).
Box Hill won the reserves premiership. Box Hill 10.11 (71) defeated Williamstown 8.11 (59) in the Grand Final, held as a curtain-raiser to the Seniors Grand Final on 24 September.

VFL Team of the Year

See also 
 List of VFA/VFL premiers
 Australian Rules Football
 Victorian Football League
 Australian Football League
 2006 AFL season

References

External links
AFL Victoria website
TRUenergy VFL website

Victorian Football League seasons
VFL